Gymnacranthera canarica is a species of plant in the family Myristicaceae. It is native to  Karnataka and Kerala in India.

References

Myristicaceae
Flora of Karnataka
Flora of Kerala
Vulnerable plants
Taxonomy articles created by Polbot